David Brown (born February 1, 1985) is a former professional ice hockey goaltender who is currently playing for the Stoney Creek Generals in the ACH. He most recently played for the Fife Flyers of the Elite Ice Hockey League (EIHL). Brown was drafted by the Pittsburgh Penguins in the 8th round, 228th overall, in the 2004 NHL Entry Draft.

Playing career
Brown was originally drafted from the Kilty Bees. Brown progressed through the Hamilton minor hockey ranks to the Provincial A Kilty Bees, and was eventually drafted by the Mississauga Ice Dogs of the OHL (Ontario Hockey League), where he was their fifth round selection in the 2001 draft. Once Brown finished his junior career, he eventually moved on to the University of Notre Dame.

Before turning professional, Brown played four seasons for the Notre Dame Fighting Irish, and was named MVP in 2006. He was a finalist for the 2007 Hobey Baker Award, which is awarded to the top collegiate player in the country. On July 3, 2007, Brown signed an entry level contract with the Pittsburgh Penguins.

On February 18, 2011, the Toronto Marlies of the American Hockey League signed Brown to a professional tryout contract, although he never suited for the Marlies, Brown remained in the Central Hockey League with the Quad City Mallards, Arizona Sundogs, Allen Americans and the Wichita Thunder.

On July 5, 2014, Brown left the CHL and signed abroad on a two-year contract with the Hull Stingrays of the EIHL, during which he studied for his master's degree at the University of Hull.

Brown played for the Fife Flyers in the Elite Ice Hockey League for the 2015–16 season and last played for the Stoney Creek Generals in the 2018 ACH.

Personal life
He is an alumnus of Bishop Ryan Catholic Secondary School in Hamilton, Ontario.

Awards and honors

References

External links

1985 births
Allen Americans players
Arizona Sundogs players
Canadian ice hockey goaltenders
Fife Flyers players
Grand Rapids Griffins players
Gwinnett Gladiators players
Hull Stingrays players
Ice hockey people from Ontario
Sportspeople from Hamilton, Ontario
Las Vegas Wranglers players
Living people
Notre Dame Fighting Irish men's ice hockey players
Pittsburgh Penguins draft picks
Quad City Mallards (CHL) players
University of Notre Dame alumni
Wheeling Nailers players
Wichita Thunder players
Wilkes-Barre/Scranton Penguins players
Canadian expatriate ice hockey players in England
Canadian expatriate ice hockey players in Scotland
AHCA Division I men's ice hockey All-Americans
Canadian expatriate ice hockey players in the United States
Canadian sportspeople of Italian descent